Miran Khsro (Kurdish: میران خەسرۆ , born 1989) is an Iraqi Kurdistan football player who currently plays as a midfielder for Sohar.

Honours
Iraqi Premier League:

 Champions (3): , 2007–08, 2008–09 and 2011–12.
 Runner-up (3): 2010–11, 2012–13, 2013–14

References

1989 births
Living people
Iraqi footballers
Kurdish sportspeople
People from Erbil
Erbil SC players
Association football midfielders
Al-Shorta SC players
Al-Shamal SC players
Qatari Second Division players
Iraq international footballers